Route 190 is a highway in northern Missouri.  Its eastern (or southern) terminus is at U.S. Route 65 north of Chillicothe; its western (or northern) terminus is at Route 146 west of Trenton.

Route description

History

Major intersections

References

190
Transportation in Livingston County, Missouri
Transportation in Daviess County, Missouri
Transportation in Grundy County, Missouri